Comeuppance is the first full album released by British progressive rock/jazz fusion band Sphere3.

Track listing
"A Good Example of Arbitrary Presumption"
"Shrimp.SNG"
"Sidewalking"
"Natural Light"
"First Kiss"
"Eat First, Ask Questions Later"
"An Unusual January"
"December Gaze"
"Tapestries"
"Paralysis"

Credits 
Steve Anderson – guitar
William Burnett – bass guitar
Neil Durant – synthesizers and Mellotron
Jamie Fisher – drums and percussion

2002 albums
Sphere3 albums